United Nations Security Council Resolution 2564 was unanimously adopted on 25 February 2021. It calls for a nationwide sanctions in Yemen. According to the resolution, the Security Council renews ban on destabilizing actors in Yemen, but Houthis reject latest resolution.

Russia abstained from the vote.

See also

Yemeni Civil War (2014–present)
 List of United Nations Security Council Resolutions 2501 to 2600 (2019–2021)

References

External links
Text of the Resolution at undocs.org

 2564
February 2021 events
2021 in Yemen
 2564
Yemeni Civil War (2014–present)